Ivan Vasilyevich Yegorov (born 1891; died 1943) was an association football player.

International career
Yegorov played his only game for Russia on May 4, 1913 in a friendly against Sweden.

External links
  Profile

1891 births
1943 deaths
Russian footballers
Russia international footballers
Association football forwards